In geometry, a myriagon or 10000-gon is a polygon with 10000 sides. Several philosophers have used the regular myriagon to illustrate issues regarding thought.

Regular myriagon
A regular myriagon is represented by Schläfli symbol {10,000} and can be constructed as a truncated 5000-gon, t{5000}, or a twice-truncated 2500-gon, tt{2500}, or a thrice-truncated 1250-gon, ttt{1250), or a four-fold-truncated 625-gon, tttt{625}.

The measure of each internal angle in a regular myriagon is 179.964°. The area of a regular myriagon with sides of length a is given by

The result differs from the area of its circumscribed circle by up to 40 parts per billion.

Because 10,000 = 24 × 54, the number of sides is neither a product of distinct Fermat primes nor a power of two. Thus the regular myriagon is not a constructible polygon. Indeed, it is not even constructible with the use of an angle trisector, as the number of sides is neither a product of distinct Pierpont primes, nor a product of powers of two and three.

Symmetry

The regular myriagon has Dih10000 dihedral symmetry, order 20000, represented by 10000 lines of reflection. Dih10000 has 24 dihedral subgroups: (Dih5000, Dih2500, Dih1250, Dih625), (Dih2000, Dih1000, Dih500, Dih250, Dih125), (Dih400, Dih200, Dih100, Dih50, Dih25), (Dih80, Dih40, Dih20, Dih10, Dih5), and (Dih16, Dih8, Dih4, Dih2, Dih1). It also has 25 more cyclic symmetries as subgroups: (Z10000, Z5000, Z2500, Z1250, Z625), (Z2000, Z1000, Z500, Z250, Z125), (Z400, Z200, Z100, Z50, Z25), (Z80, Z40, Z20, Z10), and (Z16, Z8, Z4, Z2, Z1), with Zn representing π/n radian rotational symmetry.

John Conway labels these lower symmetries with a letter and order of the symmetry follows the letter. r20000 represents full symmetry, and a1 labels no symmetry.  He gives d (diagonal) with mirror lines through vertices, p with mirror lines through edges (perpendicular), i with mirror lines through both vertices and edges, and g for rotational symmetry. 

These lower symmetries allows degrees of freedom in defining irregular myriagons. Only the g10000 subgroup has no degrees of freedom but can seen as directed edges.

Myriagram
A myriagram is a 10,000-sided star polygon. There are 1999 regular forms given by Schläfli symbols of the form {10000/n}, where n is an integer between 2 and 5,000 that is coprime to 10,000. There are also 3000 regular star figures in the remaining cases.

In popular culture
In the novella Flatland, the Chief Circle is assumed to have ten thousand sides, making him a myriagon.

See also
 Chiliagon
 Megagon

Notes

References

Polygons by the number of sides